Garrettsburg is an unincorporated community in Buchanan County, in the U.S. state of Missouri.

History
A post office called Garrettsburg was established in 1872, and remained in operation until 1902. The community has the name of Zach Garrett, a pioneer citizen.

References

Unincorporated communities in Buchanan County, Missouri
Unincorporated communities in Missouri